Municipal elections were held in Bosnia and Herzegovina on 7 October 2012. Parties, independent candidates, party or coalition lists had to register by 25 May 2012. 87 political parties and 293 independent candidates were certified to stand in the election.

Federation of Bosnia and Herzegovina

Republika Srpska

Assembly of Brčko District

References

External links 
Srebrenica and Stolac, Site of Contentious Local Election in Bosnia-Herzegovina

Elections in Bosnia and Herzegovina
2012 elections in Europe
Municipal
Municipal elections in Bosnia and Herzegovina
October 2012 events in Europe